John Markert (November 23, 1929 – June 2, 2011) was an American Republican Party politician who served as Mayor of Washington Township, Bergen County, New Jersey before being elected to the New Jersey General Assembly, where he served four terms representing the 39th Legislative District.

Born in Union City, Markert graduated from Union Hill High School.

Markert ran a local tavern and won election to the Washington Township Council in 1961, becoming the township's mayor in 1964 on a platform based on paving the many dirt roads in the community.

After Democrat Herbert Gladstone chose not to run for re-election in 1975, Markert ran for and won the open Assembly seat.

With Brendan Byrne at the top of the ticket winning the race for Governor of New Jersey, having defeated 39th district state senator Raymond Garramone in the primary, Frank Herbert won the 1977 race for Senate in the 39th District, standing together with his running mates in support of the establishment of a state income tax to defeat Markert, who had hoped to pick up Garramone's now open seat.

In the 1979 election, Gerald Cardinale and Markert defeated incumbent Democrat Greta Kiernan, who had herself defeated Markert two years earlier.

Markert moved to Westwood, New Jersey and later to Point Pleasant, New Jersey.

Markert died of cancer at his Florida home on June 2, 2011. He was survived by his wife Jean and by two daughters.

References

1929 births
2011 deaths
Deaths from cancer in Florida
Mayors of places in New Jersey
Republican Party members of the New Jersey General Assembly
People from Point Pleasant, New Jersey
People from Union City, New Jersey
People from Washington Township, Bergen County, New Jersey
People from Westwood, New Jersey
Politicians from Bergen County, New Jersey
Union Hill High School alumni